Fonteblanda is a village in Tuscany, central Italy,  administratively a frazione of the comune of Orbetello, province of Grosseto, in the Tuscan Maremma. At the time of the 2001 census its population amounted to 904.

Fonteblanda is easily reached from Via Aurelia, and is about 25 km from Grosseto and 10 km from Orbetello.

Main sights 
 Santa Maria Goretti, main parish church in the village, it was designed by engineer Ernesto Ganelli in 1950 and consecrated in 1980.
 Santa Maria dell'Osa, notable contemporary architecture designed by architect Ico Parisi in 1963.
 Poggio Talamonaccio: an Etruscan archaeological site.

See also 
 Albinia
 Ansedonia
 Giannella
 San Donato, Orbetello
 Talamone

References

External links 
 Tourism in Orbetello

Frazioni of Orbetello
Cities and towns in Tuscany
Coastal towns in Tuscany